Antonio Fernández Ortiz (born May 14, 1948) is a former track and field athlete for Spain. He competed at the 1972 Olympics in the 800 meters event.

References

1948 births
Living people
Spanish male middle-distance runners
Athletes (track and field) at the 1972 Summer Olympics
Olympic athletes of Spain
20th-century Spanish people